Tonight was a BBC television current affairs programme shown on weekday nights from  
1 September 1975 until 5 July 1979 on BBC One. It was initially presented by Sue Lawley, Denis Tuohy and Donald MacCormick and reporters included John Pitman, Richard Kershaw, David Lomax, David Jessel and Michael Delahaye. Michael Bunce was the programme's first editor. Unlike its predecessor also called Tonight which was shown in the early evening,  this programme was generally the last BBC One programme each evening and appeared at variable times. It took over from the 24 Hours programme, also on BBC One in late evenings, and ran in the same years as the BBC's Nationwide which was shown early evening.

In 1976 under editor Chris Capron, John Timpson alternated with Tuohy and MacCormick presented occasional topics. Lawley took maternity leave and Ludovic Kennedy and Robin Day, from BBC Two's Newsday current affairs series, became new presenters, supported by Melvin Bragg and Barry Norman for arts and cinema topics. Jeremy Paxman became a new presenter.

Valerie Singleton had become a  presenter and Roger Bolton the editor by the time the programme ended in July 1979, making way for Newsnight on BBC Two.

References

Current affairs shows
BBC television news shows
1975 British television series debuts
1979 British television series endings